The Sitiawan Settlement Museum is a museum in Koh Village, Sitiawan, Manjung District, Perak, Malaysia.

History
The museum building was constructed in 1935 as the house for Pioneer Methodist Church pastors. On 7 September 2003, the house was converted into a museum.

Architecture
The museum is housed in a two-story building.

Exhibitions
The museum exhibits various antique artifacts from the early days of the church. It houses more than 500 items of records, photos and historical documents on the early works by the Christians coming from Fuzhou, China.

See also
 List of museums in Malaysia
 List of tourist attractions in Perak

References

External links
 

2003 establishments in Malaysia
Manjung District
Museums established in 2003
Museums in Perak